The 1975–76 National Football League was the 45th staging of the National Football League (NFL), an annual Gaelic football tournament for the Gaelic Athletic Association county teams of Ireland.

Dublin defeated Derry in the final.

Format

Group stage

Division One

Group A play-offs

Group B play-offs

Inter-group relegation play-off

Group A Table

Group B Table

Division Two

Table

Division Three

Inter-group play-offs

Group A Table

Knockout stage

Quarter-finals

Semi-finals

Final

References

National Football League
National Football League
National Football League (Ireland) seasons